Medac GmbH (stylized as medac) is a German, worldwide operating pharmaceutical company based in Wedel near Hamburg and Tornesch, which is privately owned.

medac specializes in therapeutic agents for the treatment of oncological, urological and autoimmune diseases and their related symptoms. medac also produces therapeutics for fibrinolysis along with diagnostic agents for infection diagnostics and oncology diagnostics. The corporation owns 50% of two subsidiaries, Oncotec GmbH in Dessau Germany and oncomed manufacturing a.s. in the Czech Republic city of Brno, for the production of highly effective, sterile pharmaceuticals like cytostatics. In addition to generic products, medac has also developed its own products, which primarily covers therapeutic niches (e.g. EMA-approved Gliolan).

In addition to therapeutic agents, medac also markets diagnostic agents. The portfolio includes more than 40 infection diagnostics based on serological testing for bacterial and viral infections (antibody detection) and direct detection methods for bacteria, fungi and viruses using the PCR (polymerase chain reaction) technique. medac also provides reagent solutions for tissue differentiation of tumour samples.

History

medac GmbH, corporation for special clinical preparations, was founded in April 1970 in Hamburg by Wilfried Mohr, Claus-Olaf Welding, Dr. Werner Mai and Ernst Voss. The objective was to produce clotting preparations and pursue the production of fibrinolytics. During this time, they also began marketing diagnostic products (antibodies). Soon after, medac focused on the indication area oncology and began marketing the pharmaceutical preparation Mitomycin C.

Today, the company supply over 50 oncology compounds in a wide range of administration forms for the treatment of different types of cancer.

In the late 80s, a new indication area arose – the treatment of autoimmune diseases. Today, medac supplies Methotrexat, a folic acid antagonist for the treatment of rheumatoid arthritis, which is available in several dosage forms.

Medac has branches as well as subsidiaries and shareholdings in Denmark, Finland, Poland, Portugal, Slovakia, Sweden, Czech Republic, France, Italy, the UK and Japan as well as representative agencies in Kazakhstan Russia and Ukraine.

In October 2020, Medac, represented by a national law firm, prevailed before the European Court of Justice that the preparation Treosulfan, which Medac manufactured itself, was classified as an orphan drug.

The pharmaceuticals and diagnostics produced by Medac are delivered to 95 countries worldwide (as of 2020).

References

Pharmaceutical companies of Germany
Pharmaceutical companies established in 1970
Medical and health organisations based in Schleswig-Holstein